Sphaerophorus globosus is a species of lichen belonging to the family Sphaerophoraceae.

It has cosmopolitan distribution.

References

Lichen species
Lecanorales